The Silver Branch is a historical adventure novel for children written by Rosemary Sutcliff and published in 1957, with illustrations by Charles Keeping. Set in Britain in the last decade of the 3rd century, it is the story of Justin and Flavius, two cousins in the Roman legions who find themselves in the intrigue and battle surrounding the struggles between Carausius, a self-proclaimed emperor in Britain, Allectus, Carausius's treasurer, and Constantius, emperor in Rome.

The silver branch of the title is an article in the possession of Carausius's slave Cullen, his eccentric fool who calls himself Carausius's hound and who wears a dog's tail as part of his motley. Subtle allusions to the silver branch recur in other novels in the Eagle of the Ninth series, and it presumably refers to the otherworldly musical instrument mentioned in the medieval Irish narrative The Voyage of Bran. The Silver Branch was also a symbol of authority and a temporary "pass card" used by the Celts, consisting of a sprig of mistletoe or an apple branch.

The Silver Branch is second in Sutcliff's Roman Britain Series, following The Eagle of the Ninth (1954) and preceding Frontier Wolf (1980), The Lantern Bearers (1959), and Sword at Sunset (1963).

Summary
The story is set in 3rd-century Roman Britain, when Marcus Aurelius Carausius (Curoi), the military commander, has rebelled against Rome and named himself the emperor of Britain and northern Gaul. After a series of naval victories, he is temporarily recognized by Rome's ruler Maximian.

Justin (Tiberius Lucius Justinianus), a shy young army surgeon who had just completed his apprenticeship in Beersheba, is posted to Britain for the first time, although his family has been connected with the island for years. On arriving at Rutupiae, he meets a young centurion called Flavius (Marcelus Flavius Aquila), who turns out to be a distant cousin, and they become fast friends. Upon overhearing a plot against Carausius by his finance minister Allectus, they try to warn the emperor but, due to their perceived disloyalty, are instead reposted to Magnis on the Northern Wall in disgrace. Allectus, as treasurer, has a crucial role in Carausius's government, overseeing the minting of the coins Carausius uses to consolidate power and spread propaganda (Carausius, with the help of Allectus, issues the first proper silver coins to appear in the Roman Empire for generations, knowing that good quality bullion coinage would enhance his legitimacy and make him look more successful than Diocletian and Maximian).  By luck, Justin and Flavius meet Evicatos of the Spear (an exiled Dalriad hunter) who convinces them that the danger is real. They attempt to race back to warn Carausius, but it is already too late by then.

Faced with the prospect of capital punishment for desertion, the two cousins go into hiding with the help of a rebel leader. When he is betrayed, the two young men must take over the banner of rebellion and continue his work of protecting and smuggling away people who are disenchanted with Allectus, or who are in danger from his cruel edicts.

Finally, the western Emperor Constantius and his aide, the Praetorian prefect Asclepiodotus, sail to Britain to attempt to put an end to Allectus's misrule. Flavius and Justin assemble a ragtag group of people prepared to fight on their behalf, but are much derided for their shabby appearance. When they are hiding at their Great Aunt Honoria's place in Calleva, they discover the lost eagle standard that was buried by their ancestor, Aquila, and which entitles them to call themselves a Roman legion. Despite their looks, the new 'legion' helps the main Roman force find their way and defends the helpless inhabitants of Calleva from the fighting. In recognition of their help, the cousins are pardoned by Constantius and praised for their efforts.

The motifs of the lost eagle standard and dolphin signet ring reoccur in this book.

Background
The book is based around the 3rd century events of the Carausian Revolt, the subsequent life and death of Carausius and the defeat of the traitor Allectus.

References

1957 British novels
1957 children's books
British children's novels
Children's historical novels
Novels by Rosemary Sutcliff
Novels set in Roman Britain
Novels set in the 3rd century
290s
Oxford University Press books